X-Acto is a brand name for a variety of cutting tools and office products owned by Elmer's Products, Inc. Cutting tools include hobby and utility knives, saws, carving tools and many small-scale precision knives used for crafts and other applications.

X-Acto knife

An X-Acto knife may be called an Exacto knife, utility knife, precision knife, or hobby knife. It is a blade mounted on a pen-like aluminum body, used for crafting and hobbies, such as modelmaking. Before the availability of digital image- and text-processing tools, preparing camera-ready art for use in printing (literal cut and paste or paste up) depended heavily on the use of knives like the X-Acto for trimming and manipulating slips of paper.

A knurled collar loosens and tightens an aluminum collet with one slot, which holds a replaceable blade.

There are numerous other knives on the market with very similar designs. Blades are typically interchangeable between different brands.

History
The original knife was invented in the 1930s by Sundel Doniger, a Jewish Polish immigrant to the United States. He started a medical supply company in 1917 producing medical syringes and scalpels with removable blades. This would later be his inspiration for the X-Acto brand of knives. He had planned to sell it to surgeons as a scalpel but it was not acceptable, because it could not be cleaned.  His brother-in-law, Daniel Glück (father of poet and 2020 Nobel Prize in Literature laureate Louise Glück), suggested that it might be a good craft tool.

In 1930 a house designer asked Doniger if he could create something for him that would help him crop some advertisements, Doniger agreed and created what we now know as the X-Acto Knife.

X-Acto office products
In addition to knives, blades, and tools, X-Acto produces office supplies including pencil sharpeners, paper trimmers, staplers, and hole punches. X-Acto sharpeners are electric, battery, or manual. X-Acto has three types of trimmers: razor, rotary, and guillotine.

Boston brand
Through 2012, X-Acto sold ceramic and convection space heaters and fans under the Boston brand name.

Controversy
The use of the X-Acto knife had gained notoriety in May 2012 as it was used by Luka Magnotta who killed and dismembered Lin Jun in an Montreal apartment. During the trial in 2014, the knives were recovered but it is possible the X-Acto knives could be definitively linked to the murder.

See also
 Arts and crafts
 Knife
 Office supplies
 Olfa
 Scalpel
 Wood carving

References

External links

 

Knives
American brands
Art materials brands
Manufacturing companies based in Ohio
American companies established in 1930
Manufacturing companies established in 1930
1930 establishments in Ohio
Newell Brands
2000 mergers and acquisitions
2003 mergers and acquisitions
2015 mergers and acquisitions